IEEE/ACM Transactions on Computational Biology and Bioinformatics (abbreviated TCBB) is a bimonthly peer-reviewed scientific journal. It is a joint publication of the IEEE Computer Society, Association for Computing Machinery (ACM), IEEE Computational Intelligence Society (CIS), and the IEEE Engineering in Medicine and Biology Society. It is published in cooperation with the IEEE Control Systems Society.

The journal covers research related to:
 algorithmic, mathematical, statistical, and computational methods used in bioinformatics and computational biology
 development and testing of effective computer programs in bioinformatics
 development and optimization of biological databases
 biological results that are obtained from the use of these methods, programs, and databases
 the field of systems biology

References

External links
 

Transactions on Computational Biology and Bioinformatics
Transactions on Computational Biology and Bioinformatics
Bioinformatics and computational biology journals
Bimonthly journals
Publications established in 2004
English-language journals